Likud Yisrael Beiteinu (often referred by the Israeli media as Likud Beiteinu) was an electoral alliance formed in 2012 by the center-right Likud and the right-wing Yisrael Beiteinu to contest the January 2013 Knesset elections.

History
On 25 October 2012, several days after the decision to dissolve the 18th Knesset, and after the decision was made to hold general elections, Prime Minister Benjamin Netanyahu and Minister of Foreign Affairs Avigdor Lieberman convened a joint press conference in which they announced for the first time that their respective parties have established an electoral alliance in preparations for the 19th Knesset elections to be held in January 2013. Four days later, the Likud's Central Committee approved the decision.

According to Lieberman, the decision was made two months before it was announced.

Initially the move encountered opposition from a number of prominent Likud members, led by Michael Eitan, who referred to the move as "the Likud's destruction", nevertheless, after the approval of the move by the Likud's Central Committee he stated that he accepts the decision of the committee.
Eitan later failed to win re-election to the Knesset after performing poorly in a Likud primary election and being placed in an unrealistic spot on the party's election list.

Of the 31 seats won by Likud Beiteinu joint list, 20 were members of Likud and 11 of Yisrael Beiteinu.

The electoral alliance was unpopular among both Likud and Yisrael Beiteinu. In November 2013, it was reported that both parties would be holding discussions on whether to end their partnership. According to Haaretz, "the alliance stoked anger among senior Likud politicians, both because of the historic change and the high price the party ostensibly paid...." Efforts by Yisrael Beitenu to formally merge with Likud after the election were rebuffed by Likud activists who worried about the effect an influx of organized new power centers could have on their own influence in the ruling party.

The alliance was officially dissolved on 9 July 2014.

References

External links
Binyamin Netanyahu's Likud party 'to merge with coalition partner' – published in The Guardian on October 25, 2012
Likud members rail against merger, say 'Bibi sold us out' – published in Ynetnews on October 26, 2012
Polls show new Israeli bloc will retain power – published in the Sacramento Bee on October 28, 2012
Israel’s governing Likud Party approves teaming up with nationalist Yisrael Beiteinu faction – published in The Washington Post on October 29, 2012
 Likud Yisrael Beiteinu's list for the 19th Knesset 

Defunct political party alliances in Israel
Political parties established in 2012
Political parties disestablished in 2014
Likud
2012 establishments in Israel
2014 disestablishments in Israel
Conservative parties in Israel
Right-wing parties
Right-wing politics in Israel
Defunct conservative parties
Centre-right parties in Asia
Revisionist Zionism